Carlos Andres Dengler (born April 23, 1974), previously known as Carlos D., is an American actor, musician, writer, and filmmaker, known as the former bass guitarist for American rock band Interpol. After departing the band in 2010, he began pursuing an acting career.

Early life
Dengler was born on April 23, 1974, in Queens, New York, to a Colombian mother and a German father. He and his family lived there until his early teens, after which they relocated to Lawrenceville, New Jersey. Speaking to Spin magazine in 2005, Dengler described this move and the subsequent period as formative.

Career

1997–2010: Interpol

While attending New York University (NYU) in 1997, he was approached by the guitarist Daniel Kessler after a class the two had enrolled in. Kessler had been looking for musicians to play with and assumed Dengler to be one based on the clothes he wore, a style Kessler described as "similar to the way he's dressed now". He was studying philosophy and history at the time and wanted to pursue a career as an academic but agreed to play with the then unformed band, eventually finding his place within the group.

Dengler's trademark style is marked by grounded and stylized bass lines, strident staccato bursts, a clean tone brought about by his Fender Jazz Bass, and octave jumps, almost in a disco-like fashion. The low E string is lowered to D as the band writes many songs in the keys of D and B minor. One of his influences is the Joy Division/New Order bass guitarist Peter Hook and, like Hook, he also wears his bass guitar very low – often near knee level – and uses a pick to pluck the strings. Others of his biggest bass influences are Simon Gallup of The Cure and Andy Rourke of The Smiths.

In addition to bass guitar, Dengler played keyboards in the studio. Until the band started hiring touring musicians in support of their first album, Turn on the Bright Lights, he played both instruments during live performances.

He was a regular in the Lower East Side party scene and in 2005 URB magazine put him on the cover with a headline reading "Interpol + The Cult of Carlos D". Interviews tied in with the band's third album, Our Love to Admire, in 2007, however, marked a change in Dengler's attitude. Quotes from the time hint at a growing dissatisfaction with touring and the band in general. He described his switch from leather corset-belts, slicked hair, gun-holster and combat boots to bolo tie, waist coat, his natural curls and mustache as freeing: "Everyone stopped recognizing me on the street. I forgot what it's like just to be a normal person. It felt so good."

In May 2010, his departure was announced on the band's official website. The posting stated that he had participated in the writing and recording process for their fourth album but would not be going forward with any other Interpol related activities. A permanent replacement was not announced, only that multiple players would be taking his place on the 2010 tour.

Three months after Dengler left Interpol, the band revealed that he actually disliked playing bass guitar. Drummer Sam Fogarino stated that Dengler had grown tired of the instrument and of touring, and that it was neither his first instrument nor his instrument of choice.

The band chose not to officially replace Dengler, with David Pajo and later Brad Truax occupying the role of touring bass guitarist. For the writing and recording of Interpol's post-Dengler studio albums, Paul Banks occupies the role of bass guitarist. When asked if the band missed Dengler during a 2022 Reddit AMA, Banks stated: "He was difficult, but not too difficult. Total genius tbh."

2011–present: Post-Interpol and other ventures
Dating back to his days at NYU, Dengler is a skilled club DJ. He stopped for a short time, but picked it up again and as Interpol's fame increased he started pulling in bigger crowds both at the band's after-parties and separate gigs in various cities. He was the first rock star to appear on the cover of the electronic and hip-hop centered URB magazine, in 2005. The article focused on his history and talent as a DJ, his thoughts on various scenes, personal style and his role as the face of the band. Dengler has remixed songs for B-side releases including VHS or Beta's "Night on Fire", Nine Inch Nails's "Every Day is Exactly the Same" alongside Sam Fog (Interpol bandmate Samuel Fogarino) and Interpol's own "Public Pervert". He also contributed the piece "Katya and Josh Ain't Havin' It" to the HBO Voyeur Project.

After leaving Interpol in 2010, Dengler remained out of the public light for several years. In a 2015 interview, he stated that he had since completed a graduate degree in drama from the Tisch School of the Arts at NYU, and was pursuing acting professionally. In the time between Antics (2004) and Our Love to Admire (2007), Dengler took an interest in film composition and scoring. His work in this medium includes the short film Golgotha, which he wrote, produced and scored, as well as My Friends Told Me About You, in which he was a lead actor.

In March 2016, Dengler was a guest musician with the 8G house band on Late Night with Seth Meyers. Dengler also presented an autobiographical one-man show at the 2016 New York International Fringe Festival, Homo Sapiens Interruptus, which focused on his interest in heavy metal and paleoanthropology.

Equipment
Dengler played his brother's black American Standard Fender Jazz Bass (which was used on Turn on the Bright Lights, Antics and Our Love to Admire) with the knobs removed (Antics era and beyond) and the pickguard changed from white to black early in the band's career. He was also seen playing a cream Jazz Bass on the Late Show with David Letterman in 2007. He never used any effects pedals, claiming "Our music is almost symphonic in nature, because the harmonic structures are defined by the union of two guitars and a bass, and sometimes keyboard as well. If I were to start freaking out with effects, it would create too much of a bass presence, or it would distract from the band's most important aspect-the unity of all those musical elements together."

He also worked with a mixture of classic synthesizer and orchestral emulations to generate arrangements for Interpol and for his scores.

References

External links

 Official website
 

1974 births
American rock bass guitarists
American people of German descent
American people of Colombian descent
Living people
Nightlife in New York City
New York University alumni
People from Queens, New York
Remixers
St. Francis Preparatory School alumni
Interpol (band) members
American indie rock musicians
American post-punk musicians
Alternative rock bass guitarists
Guitarists from New York (state)
American male bass guitarists
21st-century American bass guitarists
21st-century American male musicians